The 2005 MTV Movie Awards was hosted by Jimmy Fallon. A special award, the Silver Bucket of Excellence, was presented to the 1985 film The Breakfast Club. Also, Tom Cruise was presented with the first-ever MTV Generation Award. Neither of these two special awards were voted upon by the public.
The awards were also marked by Nine Inch Nails' decision to pull out because MTV refused to let them perform using as a backdrop an unaltered image of President George W. Bush. Frontman Trent Reznor commented, "apparently the image of our president is as offensive to MTV as it is to me". Foo Fighters replaced them.

Anchorman and Mean Girls were the most nominated films, each receiving 4 nominations.

Performers
 Eminem — "Ass Like That" / "Mockingbird"
 Mariah Carey — "We Belong Together"
 Yellowcard — "Don't You (Forget About Me)"
 Foo Fighters — "Best of You"

Presenters
 Chris Rock and Adam Sandler — presented Best On-Screen Team
 Vin Diesel and Jennifer Connelly — presented Best Villain
 Nicole Kidman — presented Breakthrough Female Performance
 Jessica Alba, Chris Evans, Michael Chiklis, Ioan Gruffudd, and Julian McMahon — presented Breakthrough Male Performance 
 Rob Schneider and Eva Mendes — presented Best Comedic Performance
 Terrence Howard and Jimmy Fallon — introduced Mariah Carey
 Sandra Bullock and Jimmy Fallon — presented Best Male Performance
 Emile Hirsch and Jessica Biel — presented Best Frightened Performance
 Hilary Swank — presented Silver Bucket of Excellence Award and introduced Yellowcard
 Paul Walker and Zhang Ziyi — presented Best Kiss
 Katie Holmes — presented MTV Generation Award
 Johnny Knoxville, Seann William Scott, and Jessica Simpson — presented Best Musical Sequence
 Dwayne Johnson — presented Best Fight
 Samuel L. Jackson — presented Best Female Performance
 Hilary Duff — introduced Foo Fighters
 Tom Cruise and Dakota Fanning — presented Best Movie

Awards

Best Movie
 Napoleon Dynamite
 Kill Bill: Volume 2
 Spider-Man 2
 Ray
 The Incredibles

Best Male Performance
 Leonardo DiCaprio – The Aviator
 Jamie Foxx – Ray
 Will Smith – Hitch
 Brad Pitt – Troy
 Matt Damon – The Bourne Supremacy

Best Female Performance
 Lindsay Lohan – Mean Girls
 Uma Thurman – Kill Bill: Volume 2
 Hilary Swank – Million Dollar Baby
 Rachel McAdams – The Notebook
 Natalie Portman – Garden State

Breakthrough Male
 Jon Heder – Napoleon Dynamite
 Tim McGraw – Friday Night Lights
 Zach Braff – Garden State
 Freddie Highmore – Finding Neverland
 Tyler Perry – Diary of a Mad Black Woman

Breakthrough Female
 Rachel McAdams – Mean Girls
 Ashanti – Coach Carter
 Elisha Cuthbert – The Girl Next Door
 Bryce Dallas Howard – The Village
 Emmy Rossum – The Day After Tomorrow

Best On-Screen Team
 Lindsay Lohan, Rachel McAdams, Lacey Chabert and Amanda Seyfried (The Plastics) – Mean Girls
 Craig T. Nelson, Holly Hunter, Spencer Fox and Sarah Vowell (The Incredibles) – The Incredibles
 Will Ferrell, Paul Rudd, Steve Carell and David Koechner  (The Channel 4 News Team) - Anchorman: The Legend of Ron Burgundy
 Vince Vaughn, Christine Taylor, Rip Torn, Justin Long, Alan Tudyk, Joel David Moore, Chris Williams and Stephen Root (The Average Joes) – DodgeBall: A True Underdog Story
 John Cho and Kal Penn – Harold & Kumar Go to White Castle

Best Villain
 Ben Stiller – DodgeBall: A True Underdog Story
 Tom Cruise – Collateral
 Rachel McAdams – Mean Girls
 Jim Carrey – Lemony Snicket's A Series of Unfortunate Events
 Alfred Molina – Spider-Man 2

Best Comedic Performance
 Dustin Hoffman – Meet the Fockers
 Antonio Banderas – Shrek 2
 Will Ferrell – Anchorman: The Legend of Ron Burgundy
 Ben Stiller – DodgeBall: A True Underdog Story
 Will Smith – Hitch

Best Frightened Performance
New category added that year.
 Dakota Fanning – Hide and Seek
 Cary Elwes – Saw
 Sarah Michelle Gellar – The Grudge
 Jennifer Tilly – Seed of Chucky
 Mýa – Cursed

Best Kiss
 Rachel McAdams and Ryan Gosling – The Notebook
 Natalie Portman and Zach Braff – Garden State
 Gwyneth Paltrow and Jude Law – Sky Captain and the World of Tomorrow
 Jennifer Garner and Natassia Malthe – Elektra
 Elisha Cuthbert and Emile Hirsch – The Girl Next Door

Best Action Sequence
 Destruction of Los Angeles – The Day After Tomorrow
 The Subway Battle – Spider-Man 2
 Beverly Hills Plane Crash – The Aviator
 The Moscow Car Chase – The Bourne Supremacy
 The Desert Terrorist Assault – Team America: World Police

Best Musical Sequence
 Jon Heder — "Canned Heat" (from Napoleon Dynamite)
 Jennifer Garner and Mark Ruffalo — "Thriller" (from 13 Going on 30)
 Will Ferrell, Paul Rudd, Steve Carell and David Koechner — "Afternoon Delight" (from Anchorman: The Legend of Ron Burgundy)
 John Cho and Kal Penn — "Hold On" (from Harold & Kumar Go to White Castle)

Best Fight
 Uma Thurman vs. Daryl Hannah – Kill Bill: Volume 2
 The Battle of the News Teams – Anchorman: The Legend of Ron Burgundy
 Brad Pitt vs. Eric Bana – Troy
 Zhang Ziyi vs. Emperor's Guards – House of Flying Daggers

Best Video Game Based on a Movie
New category added that year.
 The Chronicles of Riddick: Escape from Butcher Bay
 Spider-Man 2
 Van Helsing
 Harry Potter and the Prisoner of Azkaban
 The Incredibles

MTV Generation Award
 Tom Cruise

Silver Bucket of Excellence
 The Breakfast Club

Shorts 
 "Tankman Begins"
 "Star Wars: Episode III - Revenge of the Sith "

References

External links
 MTV Movie Awards, 2005

 2005
Mtv Movie Awards
MTV Movie Awards
2005 in Los Angeles
2005 in American cinema